Sean-nós dance is an older style of traditional solo Irish dance. It is a casual dance form, as opposed to the more formal and competition-oriented form of Irish stepdance.

Sean nós in Irish means "old style", and is applied to the dance form as well as sean-nós singing. These now less-common forms of Irish dance and traditional Irish singing have been documented in Irish history and by ethnomusicologists, but are still alive in parts of the Irish music scene.

Characteristics 
Sean-nós dance is characterised by its "low to the ground" footwork, improvised steps, free movement of the arms, and an emphasis upon a "batter" (which sounds out more loudly the accented beat of the music). It is counted in beats of 8. It is traditionally a solo dance form. Because sean-nós dancing is improvisational, it is not necessary for a pre-arranged routine or choreography to be decided upon by the dancer. Spontaneous expression is highly valued. Therefore, it is less common to see groups performing synchronised sean-nós dance (which requires choreography in advance). Instead, the dancers may dance in turns, playing off the energy of the other.

Contrasted with stepdance 
Sean-nós dancing is similar to the more formal, competition oriented stepdance, but is more freeform in its expression. Stepdancing is recognisable by its stylised dance clothing, high kicks, and arms kept rigidly to the side. In comparison, the sean-nós dancers generally wear street clothing and their arms usually move with the natural rhythm of the dance or are kept loosely at their side. Some dancers incorporate large arm movements in their dance. Personal style is highly valued in sean-nós dancing.

Competition oriented stepdancing can be danced with a soft or a hard shoe, depending on the type of dance. Sean-nós dancing is done with any available street shoe that is to the liking of the individual dancer. The sound of a sean-nós dancer's footwork has a rhythmic quality. Many dancers prefer a shoe that is capable of percussive sound.

Traditional sean-nós dance surfaces include a standard wooden dance floor, a door that has been taken off the hinges, a table, a barrel, or even the top of a stool. In those cases, the skill of the dancer is shown by how well s/he can produce the various steps within the narrow bounds of the dance surface.

The good dancer danced, as it were underneath himself, trapping each note of music on the floor, and the use of the half-door and table for solo performances indicates the limited area in which he was expected to perform. – Folk Music & Dances of Ireland, Brendan Breathnach

They used to say, 'A good dancer could dance on a silver tray, and a really excellent dancer could dance on a sixpence.' Now, any modern Irish dancer would fill the whole stage." But, why compare the two? After all, says Patrick O'Dea, they are two entirely different dances – one, a traditional "old style" of step dancing, and the second, a newer and less traditional outgrowth or variation.

Varying styles 

Sean-Nós Dance: This is an old style traditional form of dancing that originated in the Connemara region (west coast of Ireland). This is a low to ground stepping out to the music, very relaxed, similar to tap dance, but it is not the stage show event like the Step Dancing you see in productions of Riverdance. Sean-nós dancing is a very impromptu, rhythmic, and low key accompaniment to a lively traditional Irish band. The footwork "battering" is great watch and listen to. These are typically done as a solo performer or in very small groups and are well suited to all ages. (oftentimes the best sean-nós dancers, are the old timers in the dark corners of the pub).

The popularization of old style dancing through competitions, stage shows and copycat teaching/learning methods has created "standard" old style steps, counter to the ideology of an improvisational, personal form of Irish dancing. Standard steps can be seen multiple times in any competition and standard tunes have emerged also, such as McCleod's reel and New Mown Meadows. Tap dancing shoes have been adopted by many prominent dancers, changing not only the sound, but also the style of the dancing.

Old style dancing may be subdivided further;
 Improvisational dancing – completely improvisational, using known movements but no predefined step sequences.
 Improvisational step dancing – a mix of improvisation and use of personal steps in an order decided on the spot.
 Step dancing – fully choreographed dance.

With the increasing popularity of competitions in old style dancing and the desire for a polished performance, many dancers opt for fully choreographed dances.

In the Irish diaspora 
As the Irish peoples emigrated, they took sean-nós dance with them. This form of dance has influenced various other forms of traditional solo dance extant around the world, e.g. Tap Dance or American traditional informal freeform solo folk dancing. Sean-nós dance in America may differ from how it is practiced in Ireland, because it in turn has been influenced by other cultures' dance styles there. Sean-nós dancing in America and Canada is most commonly seen at folk festivals and informal Irish music sessions, possibly mixed in with casual Irish Stepdancing and other regional styles. However, some dance workshops in America are beginning to introduce the style more widely.

Minimalist preservation 
The practice of sean-nós dance and song, lilting ("mouth music"), and playing "the bones" (a simple percussion instrument convenient to carry in a pocket) represented a minimalist means of preserving musical and dance heritage; one which anyone could take part in with a minimum of experience and expenditure but which had the possibility for developing considerable levels of skill with further practice.

Sean Nós flash mob 
On Saturday 5 October 2013 a group of up to fifty sean nós dancers took over Shop street, Galway in the form of a sean nós flash mob.
As many as fifty dancers, in a wide range of age groups, wowed the gathering crowd with their display. The flash mob was organised by the yearly festival known as Oireachtas na Samhna. The idea was to promote the 116th Oireachtas Festival.

With music by Johnny Óg Connolly Connemara, the first step was performed by Róisín Seoighe Connemara in her trademark red shoes before she was joined by up to 60 dancers at the pedestrian crossroads, aged between 5 and 80. The dancing lasted about eight minutes before the group dispersed as quickly as they had begun.

See also 
Sean-nós dance in United States
Irish dance
Solo dance
Step dance
Stepping (African-American)

References

External links 
  – Sean nós flash Mob
 Comórtas Damhsa Chóilín Sheáin Dharach– A dance competition and workshop held annually in Ros Muc, Conamara.
 Sean-nós Northwest – An American festival celebrating sean-nós dancing and sean-nós singing.
 RTE Radio Documentary: Heel Up – Damhsa ar an sean-nós
 Video: Johnny Connolly – A documentary about Johnny Connolly featuring sean-nós dancing.
 dance notes

Irish dances
Uses of shoes